Adaraneeya Wassanaya is a 2004 Sri Lankan romantic musical film directed by Senesh Dissanayake Bandara. It is produced along with Bandula Weerackody co-produced for Telestar Private Limited and produced by Vinod Arosha, Nalin Aponsu, Nihal Seneviratne Epa, Lalith Mirihagalle and Nimal Ekanayake for Tomorrow Films Today Private Limited. It stars Roshan Ravindra and Chathurika Pieris in lead roles along with Sachini Ayendra Stanley and Malini Fonseka. Music composed by Nawaratne Gamage.

Production 
The film is Bandara's directorial debut. It tells the story of a middle-class boy from the highlands who falls in love with an upper-class girl in Colombo. They are both high school students. The girl's arranged marriage and her illness make life difficult for the young couple. They challenge cultural conventions to succeed. The film is based on Wassana Sihinaya, a novel by Upul Shantha Sannasgala.

Plot 
Kasun Bandara Seneviratne (Roshan Ravindra) accidentally sets fire to his rented room, trying to get over the painful memories of his girlfriend, Chapa Gangadarie Abeynaike (Chathurika Pieris) after he receives news that she has been raped by her husband to be. Kasun, a country boy and Chapa meet at school. Chapa is a singer and Kasun is artistic.

Chapa has been unwell for years. it is arranged she should marry Rohan, her cousin. Rohan tries to rape her a number of times. Chapa, whose parents are employed abroad, finds affection, security, and empathy in Kasun. When Kasun tries to protect Chapa, he is beaten by Rohan. Chapa’s mother risks her only daughter’s life for Rohan’s money and denies Kasun who falls into poverty in Colombo.

Two years later, Kasun is visited by Madhupani (Sachini Ayendra) Kasun is Madhupani's language tutor. Madhupani loves Kasun, but Kasun does not reciprocate.

Chapa’s mother changes her mind and wants Kasun to save Chapa. Kasun and his friends try to do this.

Cast 
 Roshan Ravindra as Kasun Bandara Seneviratne'
 Chathurika Pieris as Chapa Gangadarie Abeynaike
 Sachini Ayendra Stanley as Madhupani
 Malini Fonseka
 Pradeep Senanayake
 Rajitha Hiran
 Sahan Ranwala as Niranga

Film crew

References 

2000s Sinhala-language films
Films set in Sri Lanka (1948–present)